Between the Stars is the fourth studio album by American rock band Flyleaf. The album was released on September 16, 2014 through Loud & Proud Records. The group funded the album through PledgeMusic. It marks the group's first and only record to feature Kristen May on vocals, who replaced original vocalist Lacey Sturm who exited the band in 2012. May exited the band in 2016. It is the group's first album to be recorded by producer Don Gilmore. Studio recording was completed in Los Angeles. The album's lead single "Set Me on Fire" debuted on July 1, 2014 at Revolver.

The album sold over 8,200 copies in the United States in its first week of release to land at position No. 33 on the Billboard 200 chart.

The album title is derived from a lyric in the song, "Magnetic".

Background and release
Kristen May stated about making the record: "When we started writing this record, we had a common hardship. Their singer had quit, and my previous band had broken up. As writers, we weren't really sure how to move forward. At the same time, we all had this shared feeling of hope and a second chance. Music came out of those experiences from coming together and persevering through whatever doubts and trials we faced in our lives. It felt like home once we began making music." She also stated: "I hope it's an album people can listen to for years to come. We put our hearts and souls into it, and I want them to hear that."

"Set Me On Fire" was released as the album's lead single and peaked at no. 36 on the Billboard Mainstream Rock chart. The album's second and final single, "Thread," reached no. 37 on the same chart.

Track listing

Personnel 

Flyleaf
 James Culpepper — drums, percussion
 Jared Hartmann — rhythm guitar
 Kristen May —  lead vocals
 Pat Seals — bass, backing vocals
 Sameer Bhattacharya — lead guitar, backing vocals, keyboards, piano

Additional personnel
 Produced and mixed by Don Gilmore, Los Angeles
 Engineered by Francesco Cameli
 Pre-production by Dave Hidek and Mark Lewis
 Mastered by Ted Jensen
 Additional composers: Dave Bassett, Don Gilmore and Johnny Andrews
 Art direction and design by Douglas Hale
 Photo by Travis Shinn

References 

2014 albums
Flyleaf (band) albums